Paisley Canal may refer to:

 Paisley Canal line, a railway line in Paisley, Scotland
 Paisley Canal railway station, a station on the Paisley Canal Line